Georgios "George" Kamperidis (alternate spelling: Giorgos, Kaberidis) (born October 1, 1999) is a Greek professional basketball player for PAOK of the Greek Basket League. He is 2.01 m (6'7") tall, and he plays at the shooting guard and small forward positions.

Professional career
After playing basketball with the youth clubs of Mandraikos and Doukas, Kamperidis began his pro career in the Greek Basket League, with Panionios, starting with the 2017–18 season. During the 2019-20 season, he averaged 4.2 points and 1.6 rebounds per game. 

On August 3, 2020, Kamperidis moved to Thessaloniki and signed with PAOK. On April 23, 2021, Kamperidis signed a contract extension for another two seasons. During the 2021-22 campaign, in a total of 20 games, he averaged 3.2 points, 1.2 rebounds and 0.5 steals, playing around 10 minutes per contest.

National team career
Kamperidis has been a member of the Greek junior national teams. With Greece's youth national teams, he played at the 2017 FIBA U18 European Championship, the 2018 FIBA U20 European Championship, and at the 2019 FIBA U20 European Championship.

Personal life
Kamperidis' older brother, Michalis, is also a professional basketball player.

References

External links
FIBA Profile
Basketball-Reference.com Profile
Eurobasket.com Profile
RealGM.com Profile
Greek Basket League Profile 
Greek Basket League Profile 
Panionios Profile 

1999 births
Living people
Greek Basket League players
Greek men's basketball players
Panionios B.C. players
P.A.O.K. BC players
Shooting guards
Small forwards
Basketball players from Athens